Said Hussein Iid is a Somali politician. He hails from the northeastern Puntland region of Somalia, and belongs to the Arab Salah Meheri clan. Iid previously served as the Chairman of the Puntland Chamber of Commerce, Industry and Agriculture. In January 2015, he was briefly named the new Minister of Health-designate of Somalia by Prime Minister Omar Abdirashid Ali Sharmarke. However, he only served 2 weeks when on 17 January 2015, Prime Minister Sharmarke dissolved his newly nominated cabinet due to vehement opposition by legislators, who rejected the reappointment of certain former ministers. On 27 January 2015, Sharmarke appointed a new, smaller 20 minister cabinet and was named the new Minister of Livestock and Pasture of Somalia. He has now been succeeded by Sheikh Nur Mohamed Hassan.

See also
Abdulkadir Abdi Hashi

References

Living people
Ethnic Somali people
Somalian Muslims
Government ministers of Somalia
Year of birth missing (living people)